Ilgan Sports (The Daily Sports or 1S for short)  is a South Korean daily sports and entertainment newspaper founded in 1969. Formerly under Hankook Ilbo, it is now owned by the JoongAng Media Network through JTBC Plus.

History
 September 1969 - Ilgan Sports was launched as a sister newspaper of Hankook Ilbo.
 March 1970 - The newspaper exceeded 43,000 copies sold.
 May 2001 - Ilgan Sports signed a partnership agreement with Japan's Hochi Shimbun (now Sports Hochi).
 July 2001 - It joined the KOSDAQ.
 December 2005 - JoongAng Ilbo acquired Ilgan Sports.
 April 2006 - The newspaper used its shortened name 1S for the first time, and incorporated it in its logo. 
 May 2010 - The newspaper's headquarters was relocated to the JoongAng Media Building in Seoul, sharing one place with JoongAng Ilbo. 
 December 2015 - JTBC Plus takes over as publisher of Ilgan Sports.

References

External links
 

1969 establishments in South Korea
Daily newspapers published in South Korea
Publications established in 1969
Sports mass media in South Korea
Sports newspapers
Korean-language newspapers